Clackmannan was a parliamentary constituency in the Clackmannan area of Central Scotland. It returned one Member of Parliament (MP) to the House of Commons of the Parliament of the United Kingdom, elected by the first past the post system.

The constituency was created for the 1983 general election, replacing the previous Clackmannan and East Stirlingshire constituency.  The Clackmannan constituency was abolished for the 1997 general election.

Boundaries
Clackmannan District, the Falkirk District electoral division of Carseland, and the Stirling District electoral division of Kinnaird.

Members of Parliament

Politics and history of the constituency

Election results

Elections of the 1980s

Elections of the 1990s

References 

Historic parliamentary constituencies in Scotland (Westminster)
Constituencies of the Parliament of the United Kingdom established in 1983
Constituencies of the Parliament of the United Kingdom disestablished in 1997
Politics of Clackmannanshire
Clackmannan